Neil Wilkinson (16 February 1955 – 2 August 2016) was an English footballer. A right-back, he made 112 league appearances in a nine-year career in the Football League, turning out for Blackburn Rovers, Port Vale, and Crewe Alexandra. He won the Third Division title with Rovers in 1974–75.

Career
Wilkinson began his career with Blackburn Rovers, beginning his apprenticeship in August 1971. He made his first-team debut in the FA Cup at Lincoln City on 18 November 1972. He turned professional in February 1973. Blackburn finished third in the Third Division in 1972–73 under the stewardship of Ken Furphy. They dropped to 13th in 1973–74, before new boss Gordon Lee guided them to promotion as champions in 1974–75. Jim Smith then took charge at Ewood Park, as Rovers retained their Second Division status with mid-table finishes in 1975–76 and 1976–77. Wilkinson was only a first-team regular for part of the 1975–76 season when Mick Heaton was out injured and was behind Derek Fazackerley and Kevin Hird in the pecking order during the 1976–77 campaign. Wilkinson then spent a brief time in South Africa, before he returned to England to join Fourth Division club Port Vale in June 1978. He played nine competitive games for Dennis Butler's "Valiants" in 1978–79, before being transferred to Warwick Rimmer's Crewe Alexandra, along with £3,000, in exchange for Kevin Tully in October 1978. The "Railwaymen" finished bottom of the Football League in 1978–79, and under Tony Waddington's stewardship had to re-apply for re-election again in 1979–80, before rising to 18th place in 1980–81.

Career statistics
Source:

Honours
Blackburn Rovers
Football League Third Division: 1974–75

References

1955 births
2016 deaths
Footballers from Blackburn
English footballers
Association football fullbacks
Blackburn Rovers F.C. players
Expatriate soccer players in South Africa
English expatriates in South Africa
Port Vale F.C. players
Crewe Alexandra F.C. players
English Football League players